Mehul is an Indian male given name of Sanskrit origin, meaning rain or cloud.

Notable people with this name include:

 Mehul Buch, Indian actor
 Mehul Choksi (born 1964/65), Indian businessman
 Mehul Kumar (b. 1949), Indian film director
 Mehul Patel (born 1989), Indian cricketer
 Mehul Shah, American actor

See Also

 Étienne Méhul (1765-1817), French composer

References

Indian masculine given names